The 1987 Sam Houston State Bearkats football team represented Sam Houston State University as a member of the Southland Conference during the 1987 NCAA Division I-AA football season. Led by sixth-year head coach Ron Randleman, the Bearkats compiled an overall record of 8–3 with a mark of 5–1 in conference play, and finished tied for second in the Southland.

Schedule

References

Sam Houston State
Sam Houston Bearkats football seasons
Sam Houston State Bearkats football